Aadat is originally a song by Jal band. It was sung by Atif Aslam and composed by Goher Mumtaz. Later it was released in several different versions in Jal's album Aadat by Farhan Saeed and Atif Aslam's solo album Jal Pari. It was also used in the Bollywood films Kalyug and Chocolate.

Original/JalPari Version 

The song was written by Goher Mumtaz,Atif Aslam, sung by Atif Aslam, music by the band Jal. That time, Atif was the lead singer of Jal. Atif recorded Aadat with his pocket money at the age of 17. The band released the song on the internet in December 2003. The song was used in Atif Aslam's first solo album Jal Pari. The song became a youth anthem. By the time the song was released, it became a major hit in the subcontinent and all radio and TV stations started playing the song. Another deep blue version of the song was also used in the same album. The music video of the song was directed by Umer Anwar.

The song was featured in Ramin Bahrani's 2005 film Man Push Cart which has won international awards and was praised by the critics.

Atif Aslam in an interview with OK! Pakistan said: "Well, I had no idea it was going to do that well." He further added that he just thought that Aadat would be this one-hit-wonder and he recorded it in his first album Jal Pari. He put the song on internet to which he received fantastic feedback from the audiences.

Faizan-ul-Haque, who is former VJ on Indus Music criticized the song by saying: "Aadat was not the best song of its time, but it is one that the young public connected with the most."

Mixed Version 

In Jal's first album Aadat, the song was made by Jal, having same composition and lyrics as of Atif's version. It was sung by Farhan Saeed, as Atif had left the band at that time. Another song was also made in the same tone as of Aadat with different lyrics named Bikhra Hoon Main.

Farhan Saeed said that he is grateful to his fans all around for accepting and loving his music. He said that "Wo Lamhey" and "Aadat" became youth anthems, not only in Pakistan but also in India and in other countries where people speak Urdu and Hindi.

Kalyug version 

The track "Aadat" was reused in 2005's Mohit Suri film Kalyug with music being recreated by Mithoon under the label Sa Re Ga Ma. Lyrics and music were given by Goher. It was sung by Atif Aslam. Remix version was sung by Atif and remixed by DJ Suketu. Another version was also used in the film which was sung by Jal. This song has sales over 1,400,000.

Credits 
 Song – Aadat and Aadat (Remix)
 Movie – Kalyug
 Year – 2005
 Singer – Atif Aslam
 Music – Jal, Goher Mumtaz, Mithoon Sharma, DJ Suketu
 Lyrics – Goher Mumtaz, Sayeed Quadri
 Label – Saregama India Limited
Note: All credits taken from YouTube.

Chocolate version 

In 2005 film, Chocolate, directed by Vivek Agnihotri, the song was remade. Composed by Pritam and lyrics by Praveen Bharadwaj. Solo version was sung by KK, while duet version was sung by KK and Shreya Ghoshal. It was titled as Zahreeli Raatein.

Credits 
 Song – Zahreeli Raatein
 Film – Chocolate
 Year – 2005
 Artists – Emraan Hashmi, Tanushree Dutta, Sunil Shetty
 Singer – K.K. and Shreya Ghoshal
 Music Director – Pritam
 Lyricist – Praveen Bhardwaj
 Label – T-Series
Note: Credits adapted from YouTube.

Awards and nominations 
The track won the awards of 'Best Lyrics', 'Best Song' and 'Best Composition' at the 2005 Indus Musik Awards.

Summary of different versions
There are several official versions of the song sung by different singers.
Aadat (original version) by Atif Aslam (composed by Atif and Goher) released in Atif Aslam's Jal Pari in 2004.
Aadat (deep blue version) by Atif Aslam for his own album Jal Pari in 2004.
Aadat (and Aadat Remix) by Atif Aslam for the film Kalyug in 2005.
Aadat by Farhan Saeed in the album Aadat of Jal in 2004.
Bikhra Hoon Main by Farhan Saeed for the album Aadat of Jal in 2004.
Zahreeli Raatein (solo version) by Pritam & KK for the film Chocolate in 2005.
Zahreeli Raatein (duet version) by Pritam, featuring singers KK and Shreya Ghoshal was used for the promotion of the film Chocolate in 2005.

In table format

Track listings

Release history

Controversies 
After the release of the deep blue version of the song in Atif's single album Jal Pari, there were disputes between Atif and Jal about who held the copyright of the song.

References

2004 singles
2004 songs
Pakistani songs
Atif Aslam songs
Songs written by Atif Aslam